Nanxi is a town in Yunyang County, Chongqing, China. , it had five residential neighborhoods and 29 villages under its administration.
Neighborhoods
Nanxi Community
Shuishi Community
Changhong Community
Xinyang Community
Weixing Community

 Villages
Huaguo Village
Jinyin Village
Shuishi Village
Tianhe Village
Huomai Village
Qingyun Village
Fangjia Village
Guixi Village
Qingyin Village
Jixian Village
Yanqu Village
Hongyan Village
Gongqiao Village
Daji Village
Xilin Village
Fuqiao Village
Pushan Village
Xiyun Village
Xinyang Village
Tapeng Village
Nanmu Village
Huanggao Village
Yandong Village
Fujia Village
Shiqu Village
Qingshan Village
Mao'erliang Village
Hongshi Village
Ping'an Village

See also 
 List of township-level divisions of Chongqing

References 

Township-level divisions of Chongqing
Yunyang County